"Everyday" is a song by the English electronic band Orchestral Manoeuvres in the Dark (OMD), released in 1993 as the third and last single from their ninth album, Liberator (1993). Co-founder Paul Humphreys, who had left the group four years prior, is credited as a co-writer. "Everyday" was the only single from Liberator to miss the UK Top 25, charting at number 59.

The accompanying music video features Sara Cox, who would later be known as a BBC Radio DJ.

Reception
Alan Jones of Music Week scored the single three-out-of-five, writing, "Jaunty, polished pop without a soul. Oh, for the more angst-ridden OMD of old. Still, it's the kind of song that will appeal to radio — very 'up' and sufficiently commercial to make the usual OMD splash." In a retrospective article, Classic Pops Wyndham Wallace likened the track to a "horrifying" Stock Aitken Waterman pastiche. OMD frontman Andy McCluskey conceded, "Sadly it wasn't one of our better songs."

Track listing
 7" single (Virgin / VS 1471 (UK))
"Everyday"
"Every Time"

 Cassette single (Virgin / VSC 1471 (UK))
"Everyday"
"Every Time"

 5" CD single (Jewel case) (Virgin / VSCDT 1471)
"Everyday"
"Every Time"
"Dream of Me (Based on Love's Theme) (Interstella Mix)"
"Everyday (Invisible Man Mix)"

 5" CD single (Digipak) (Virgin / VSCDG 1471)
"Everyday"
"Electricity (Live)"
"Walk Tall (Live)"
"Locomotion (Live)"

Charts

References

1993 singles
Orchestral Manoeuvres in the Dark songs
Songs written by Andy McCluskey
Songs written by Paul Humphreys
Songs written by Stuart Kershaw
1993 songs
Virgin Records singles